Uldall is a surname. Notable people with the surname include:

Bjørn Uldall (born 1994), Danish ice hockey player
Elizabeth T. Uldall (1913–2004), American linguist and phonetician
Gunnar Uldall (1940–2017), German politician and former state minister of Economy and Labour in Hamburg
Hans Jørgen Uldall (1907–1957), Danish linguist

See also 
Udall (disambiguation)